is a train station located in Shimabara, Nagasaki Prefecture, Japan. It is on the Shimabara Railway Line which is operated by the third-sector Shimabara Railway.

The line follows a scenic route around the Shimabara Peninsula, off the coast of the Ariake Sea. Japan National Route 251 also runs parallel to the station.

Lines 
 Shimabara Railway
 Shimabara Railway Line

It is 35.2 km from Isahaya. Only local services stop at the station.

Trains to Kazusa were terminated on the 1st of April 2008 after the stretch of line from Shimabara closed.

Adjacent stations

See also 
 List of railway stations in Japan

References 
This article incorporates material from the corresponding article in the Japanese Wikipedia.

External links 
 
  
 Navitime station timetable 
 Yahoo! Transit Japan 

Railway stations in Japan opened in 1931
Railway stations in Nagasaki Prefecture